The Canadian Conspiracy is a 1985 HBO/CBC mockumentary, co-written and directed by Robert Boyd, about the way the Government of Canada is subverting the United States by taking over its entertainment industry. The film features many Canadians famous in the US who do not emphasize their Canadian origins being hounded by ANN (American News Network) reporters about the Canadian conspiracy.

The story is about celebrities who were born Canadian and are now American citizens who made it successful in American showbiz, and a conspiracy about Leslie Nielsen's brother Erik, then Deputy Prime Minister of Canada.

Cast

External links

1985 films
Canadian identity
Canadian comedy television films
Canadian mockumentary films
Films about Canada–United States relations
1985 comedy films
1980s English-language films
1980s Canadian films